This is a list of English-language Canadian television series. For Canadian French-language shows, please see List of French-language Canadian television series.

To collate by year, see List of years in Canadian television.

0–9
1 Girl 5 Gays – talk show (2009–2014)
1 Queen 5 Queers – talk show (2021)
1-800-Missing – drama/action (2003–2006)
10% QTV – news/information (1995–2001)
100 Huntley Street – talk/religious (1977–present)
15/Love – teen drama (2004–2006)
16x9 – investigative (2008–2016)
18 to Life – comedy (2010–2011)
19–2 – drama (2014–2017)
2001: A Space Road Odyssey – documentary/paranormal (2001)
20/20 – documentary (1962–1967)
24 Hour Rental – comedy (2014)
49th & Main – soap opera (2006)
6Teen – teen/animated (2004–2010)
72 Hours: True Crime – drama/action (2004–2007)
90 Minutes Live – talk/variety (1976–1978)
9B – teen drama (1989)

A
Absolutely Canadian – documentary (2005–present)
Across the River to Motor City – drama (2007)
Acting Good – sitcom (2022)
Adderly – drama/action (1986–1988)
Adrienne at Large – news/information (1974–1975)
Adrienne Clarkson Presents – music/variety (1988–1999)
Adventure Inc. – drama/action (2002–2003)
Adventures in Rainbow Country – adventure drama (1970–1971)
The Adventures of Napkin Man – children's/animated
The Adventures of Paddington Bear – children's/animated (1997–2002)
The Adventures of Shirley Holmes – children’s mystery 
The Adventures of Sinbad – children's/animated (1996–1998)
The Adventures of Timothy Pilgrim – children's (1975)
The Adventures of Tintin – children's/animated (1991–1992)
The Adventures of Tugboat Annie – comedy/sitcom (1957–1958)
African Skies – drama/action (1992–1994)
The Agenda – current affairs (2006–present)
Airwaves – drama/action (1986–1990)
Alan Hamel's Comedy Bag – comedy/sketch (1972–1973)
Alias Grace – historical drama (2017)
Alienated – science fiction (2003–2004)
All Around the Circle – music/variety (1964–1975)
All for Nothing? – reality (2010–present)
All-Round Champion – youth sports competition (2020–present)
Alphabet Soup – children's (1971–1973)
The Amazing Race Canada – reality (2013–present)
An American in Canada – comedy/sitcom (2003–2004)
Anaana's Tent – children's/animated/live action/puppet/Inuit culture (2018–present)
Anash and the Legacy of the Sun-Rock – animated children's/First Nations culture (2007)
Andromeda – science fiction (2000–2005)
Angela Anaconda – children's/animated (1999–2002)
Animal Crackers – children's/animated (1997–1999)
Animal Mechanicals – children's/animated (2007–2011)
Anne of Green Gables – drama/action (1985)
Any Woman Can – lifestyle/travel (1974–1975)
Anyone's Game – sports documentary (2021)
Anything You Can Do – game show (1971–1974)
APTN Mainstage – music/variety (1996)
APTN National News – news
Arctic Air – drama (2012–2014)
Are You Afraid of the Dark? – children's/thriller/horror (1990–1996; 2019–present)
Are You Smarter Than a Canadian 5th Grader? – game show (2007)
Arthur (1996–2022)
Arts '73/'74/'75 – informational/arts and literature (1973–1975)
The Associates – drama/action (2001–2002)
Atlantic Summer – informational (1978–1979)
Atomic Betty – science-fiction/children's/animated (2004–2008)
The Atwood Stories – dramatic anthology (2003)

B
Babar – children's/animated (1989–2002)
Backyard Beats – children's/music (2020–present)
Backyard Builds – home renovation (2017–present)
Bad Blood – crime drama (2017-2019)
Bad Dog – children's/animated (1998–2000)
The Bachelor Canada – reality/drama (2012–present)
Balance: Television for Living Well – talk/informational (2004–2008)
Ballooner Landing – children's
Bandwagon with Bob Francis – music/variety (1972–1975)
Barbara Frum – talk/informational (1974–1975)
Barely Cooking – lifestyle/cooking
The Baroness Von Sketch Show – sketch comedy (2016–present)
The Baxters – comedy (1979–1981)
The Beachcombers – comedy/drama (1972–1990)
Beast Machines: Transformers – children's/animated (1999–2000)
Beast Wars: Transformers – children's/animated (1996–1999)
Because I Said So – talk/comedy and variety
Beetlejuice – children's/animated (1989–1991)
Being Erica – comedy/drama (2009–2011)
Being Human – supernatural/horror (2011–2014)
Bellevue – crime drama (2017)
Benmergui Live – news–oriented talk show
The Best Laid Plans – comedy/drama (2014)
Best Recipes Ever – cooking (2010–2014)
The Best Years – teen/drama (2007–2009)
Between – science fiction (2015–2016)
Beyond Reality – science fiction (1991–1993)
Beyond Reason – game show (1977–1980)
The Big Breakfast – news/morning
Big Brother Canada – reality (2013–present)
The Big Comfy Couch – children's (1992–2006)
Big Wolf on Campus – horror/teen/drama (1999–2002)
Billable Hours – comedy/sitcom (2006–2008)
Birdz – animated (1998–1999)
Birth Stories – documentary (2000–2004)
Bits and Bytes – news/education (1983–1991)
Bitten – drama/fantasy/horror (2014–2016)
Bizarre – comedy/sketch (1980–1986)
Black Harbour – drama/action (1996–1999)
Blackfly – comedy/sitcom (2001–2002)
Blackstone – political/crime drama (2011–2015)
Bliss – drama/action (2002–2004)
 BLK, An Origin Story - documentary (2022)
Blood Ties – drama (2007)
Bloodletting & Miraculous Cures – medical drama (2010)
Blue Murder – crime drama/action (2001–2004)
Bluff – game show 
Bob & Doug – comedy/animated (2009–2011)
Bob and Margaret – comedy/animated (1998–2001)
The Bobroom – sketch comedy (2004)
Bomb Girls - period  drama (2012–2013)
Boogie – dance music show on City TV 
The Book of Negroes (2015)
The Border – drama/action (2008–2010)
Braceface – children's/animated (2001–2004)
Brave New Girls – reality (2014–present)
Breaker High – teen comedy/drama (1997–1998)
Breakfast Television – news/morning
The Bridge – police drama (2010)
British Columbia: An Untold History – documentary
Bumper Stumpers – game show (1987–1990)
Burden of Truth – legal drama (2018–2021)
Busytown Mysteries – children's/animated (2007–2010)
Butch Patterson: Private Dick – comedy (1999–2001)
Buy Herself – reality/real estate (2012–2013)
Buzz – comedy (2000–2005)

C
Caillou – children's/animated
Call Me Mother – reality/competition
Cam Boy – drama
Camp Cariboo – children's
Campaign Politics – news/talk
The Campbells – drama
Canada 98 – documentary
Canada After Dark – talk/comedy/variety
Canada AM – news/morning
Canada in View – documentary
Canada: A People's History – documentary
Canada: The Story of Us – documentary
Canada's Drag Race – reality
Canada's Got Talent – reality
Canada's Next Top Model – reality
Canada's Worst Driver – reality
Canadian Antiques Roadshow – lifestyle
The Canadian Establishment – documentary
The Canadian Experience – documentary
Canadian Express – music/variety
Canadian Idol – reality
Cannonball – adventure/drama
The Care Bears Family – children's/animated (1986–1988)
Cardinal – crime drama (2017-2020)
Carnival Eats – food
Carter – crime drama (2018-2020)
A Case for the Court – reality
Cash Cab – game show
Cashing In – comedy-drama
Catch Up – children's
Catwalk – drama
Caught – crime drama
Caution: May Contain Nuts – sketch comedy
Cavendish – comedy
CBC News – news
CBC News Magazine – newsmagazine
CBC News: Morning – news
CBC News: Sunday – news
CBC News: Today – news
CBC Selects – anthology
Celebrity Cooks – lifestyle/cooking
CFL on CBC – sports
CFL on TSN – sports
Charlie Had One But He Didn't Like It, So He Gave It To Us – sketch comedy (1966)
Charlie Jade – drama/mystery/science fiction (2005)
Chasing Rainbows – drama
Check It Out! – comedy/sitcom
Chef at Home – lifestyle/cooking
Chef in Your Ear – cooking/reality
Chez Hélène – children's (bilingual, aired on CBC's English network)
Children Ruin Everything – comedy (2022)
Chilly Beach – comedy/animated (2003–2008)
Chopped Canada – cooking/competition (2014–2017)
Chris & John's Road Trip! – comedy/reality
Christine Cushing Live – lifestyle/cooking
Circle Square – religious/children's
Circus – circus/variety
Cities – documentary
The City – drama/action (1999)
Class of the Titans – action/children's/animated
Clone High – comedy/animated
Close-Up – interview
Closer – music
CODCO – comedy/sketch
Cold Squad – police procedural/drama
The Collaborators – drama/action
Combat Hospital – medical/drama/military/war
Comedy at Club 54 – comedy/stand-up
Comedy Inc. – comedy/sketch
Comedy Network Presents – comedy/stand-up
Comedy Now – comedy/stand-up
Comics! – comedy/stand-up
Coming Up Rosie – comedy/sitcom
Committed – comedy/animated
Commonwealth Jazz Club – music, with ABC and BBC
Commonwealth Televiews – news
Connect with Mark Kelley – news
Connor Undercover  – teen action-comedy
Continuum – science fiction (2012–2015)
Conviction Kitchen – reality/documentary
Cooking with the Wolfman – lifestyle/cooking
Corner Gas – comedy/sitcom (2004-2009)
Corner Gas Animated – animated/comedy (2018–2021)
Country Canada – documentary
Countrytime – music/variety
Cracked – drama (2013)
Cra$h & Burn – drama (2009)
Crash Gallery – reality
Crawford – comedy
Cross Canada Barndance – music/variety
The Crow: Stairway to Heaven – action/crime/drama/thriller (1998–1999)
Cucumber – children's
A Cut Above - reality/competition
Cyberchase – children's/animated
Cybersix – sci-fi/drama/cartoon

D
The D Cut – comedy/drama
Da Kink in My Hair – comedy/drama
Da Vinci's City Hall – drama
Da Vinci's Inquest – drama/action
Daily Planet, previously known as @discovery.ca – science/technology
Dan for Mayor – comedy
Danger Bay – drama/action
Dark Matter – science fiction
The David Steinberg Show – comedy
Deal or No Deal Canada – game show
Dear Aunt Agnes – children's
Death Comes to Town – comedy
Debbie Travis' Facelift – lifestyle
Debbie Travis' Painted House – lifestyle
Decked Out – home renovation
The Decorating Adventures of Ambrose Price – lifestyle
Defi mini-putt – sports
Definition – game show
Degrassi High – children's (1989–1991)
Degrassi Junior High – children's (1987–1989)
Degrassi: Next Class – children's (2016–2017)
Degrassi: The Next Generation (later shortened to Degrassi for seasons 10–14) – children's (2001–2015)
Deke Wilson's Mini-Mysteries – children's/mystery (1989–1990)
Delilah – sitcom
Delta State – science fiction/animated
Denny's Sho – music/variety
Design Interns – reality competition (2006)
Design Rivals – lifestyle
Designer Guys – lifestyle
Destiny Ridge – drama
The Detail – crime drama
The Detectives – true crime docudrama
Dex Hamilton: Alien Entomologist – animated
Di-Gata Defenders – science fiction/children's/animated
Diamonds – action/comedy
Diggstown – legal drama
The Dini Petty Show – talk/variety
Disclosure – news/information
The Dish Show – comedy
D'Myna Leagues – children's/animated
Dr. Zonk and the Zunkins – children's
Dog House – children's
Dollars and Sense – informational/business
Don Messer's Jubilee – music/variety
Dooley Gardens – sitcom
Dragon Tales
Dragons' Den – reality/business
Dress Rehearsal – children's; see Drop-In
Drifters: The Water Wars – reality
Drop the Beat – drama/action
Drop-In – children's
The Drunk and On Drugs Happy Fun Time Hour – comedy
Due South – drama/action (1994–1999)
Durham County – crime drama (2007-2010)

E
E.N.G. – drama/action
Ear to the Ground – music/documentary
Earth: Final Conflict – science fiction (1997–2002)
Ed, Edd n Eddy – children's/animated
Ed's Night Party – comedy/talk
Edgemont – drama/action
The Edison Twins – drama/action
Ekhaya: A Family Chronicle – dramatic miniseries
Electric Circus – music/dance
The Eleventh Hour – drama/action
Elwood Glover's Luncheon Date – talk/interview
Emily of New Moon – drama/family
Empire, Inc. – drama miniseries
Employable Me – documentary
Encounter – news/information
Endgame – drama/mystery/crime
Enslaved – documentary
Eric's World – children's
eTalk Daily – news/entertainment
Everyone's Famous – comedy
Excuse My French – sitcom

F
The Fabulous Show with Fay and Fluffy - children's
The Fabulous Sixties – documentary
The Face of Furry Creek – comedy
Fairy Tale – reality/dating
Fakes - comedy
Falcon Beach – drama (2004-2006)
La Famille Plouffe – drama
Family Law – drama (2021–present)
The Family Restaurant – documentary/reality
Famous Jury Trials – drama
FANatical – reality (2006–2007)
#FAQMP – interview
The Fifth Estate – news/information
Finding Stuff Out – children's/science
First Contact – documentary
First Person Singular: Pearson – The Memoirs of a Prime Minister – documentary
First Wave – science fiction
Flash Forward  – teen sitcom
Flashpoint – police drama (2008-2013)
Fool Canada – comedy
Foolish Heart – dramatic anthology
For Better or For Worse – comedy/animated
For Heaven's Sake – documentary
For the Record – dramatic anthology
Foreign Objects – dramatic anthology
The Forest Rangers – drama/action
Forever Knight – drama/action
Forgive Me – drama
Fortunate Son – drama
The Foundation – comedy
Four Directions – drama anthology
Four in the Morning – comedy-drama
Four on the Floor – comedy/sketch
Fraggle Rock – children's (1983–1987)
Franklin – children's/animated
Franklin and Friends – children's/CGI animated
Fred Penner's Place – children's
Free to Fly – children's/exercise (1980s)
Friday the 13th: The Series – horror/supernatural
Friday Night Football – sports
Friday Night with Ralph Benmergui – talk/comedy and variety
Fridge Wars – cooking competition (2020–present)
The Friendly Giant – children's
Fries with That? – teens/sitcom
From the Ground Up with Debbie Travis – reality
From Spain with Love with Annie Sibonney – reality
From the Vaults – music performance
Front Page Challenge – game show
Funny as Hell – stand-up comedy
Funny Farm – comedy/music
Future History – documentary
F/X: The Series – action/crime/drama (1996–1998)

G
G2G – animated
G-Spot – comedy
Gallery – documentary
The Galloping Gourmet – lifestyle/cooking
Game On – teen sitcom
Gaming Show (In My Parents' Garage) – children's
The Gavin Crawford Show – comedy/sketch
Gay News and Views – LGBT community newsmagazine
George – family
George Shrinks – children's/animated/family
Gespe'gewa'gi: The Last Land – documentary
A Gift to Last – drama/action (1976–1979)
Gisèle's Big Backyard – children's (2005–2016)
Giver – children's/reality
Global Currents – news/documentary
Global National – news
Global Playhouse – drama anthology (1984–1986)
Global Sunday – news/information (2001–2005)
God's Greatest Hits – music/documentary
Godiva's – comedy/drama (2005–2006)
Going Great – children's
Gold Trails and Ghost Towns – historical documentary/talk show
Good Dog – comedy/drama
Good God – comedy/drama
Good Morning Canada – news/morning
Good People – documentary
Good Rockin' Tonite – music/variety 
The Goods – talk show
Goosebumps – children's horror anthology
The Great Canadian Baking Show – cooking/competition (2017–present)
The Great Canadian Holiday Baking Show cooking/competition (2019)
The Great Debate – talk show/debate
The Great Detective – drama/action
Group Sext – reality/dating (2020–present)
The Guard – drama
Guilt Free Zone – variety/sketch comedy
Gut Job - reality/home renovation
Gutterball Alley – game show/comedy

H
Hammy Hamster – children's
Hangin' In – comedy/sitcom
Happy House of Frightenstein – children's cartoon
Happy Tree Friends – black comedy
Hard Rock Medical – medical drama
Harriet's Magic Hats – children's
Harrigan – children's
Hatching, Matching and Dispatching – comedy
Haven – supernatural/drama
He Shoots, He Scores – drama/action
Headline Hunters – game show
Health Matters – lifestyle/health
Heartland – drama
Here Come the Seventies – documentary
Heritage Minutes – 60-second PSAs aired on all networks
Hiccups – comedy
Highlander: The Raven – science fiction
Highlander: The Series – science fiction
The Hilarious House of Frightenstein – children's sketch comedy
Hinterland Who's Who – 30-second PSAs aired on all networks
Hip-Hop Evolution – music/documentary
History Bites – comedy/satire/information
History Erased – documentary
Hockey Night in Canada – sports
Holly Hobbie – teen drama
Holmes Family Effect – renovation
Holmes Inspection – home improvement
Holmes on Homes – home improvement
The Holmes Show – comedy/sketch
Home Fires – drama/action
Home to Win – home improvement/competition
Homemade Television – comedy/sketch
Hot Type – talk/informational
House of Venus Show – comedy/sketch
How It's Made – documentary
How to Be Indie – children's comedy
Howie Mandel's Sunny Skies – sketch comedy
Howie Meeker's Hockey School – sports
Huckleberry Finn and His Friends – adventure
Human Edge – news/information
Humour Resources – comedy
Hymn Sing – music/religious

I
I Do, Redo – reality
I Hate Hollywood – comedy
The Illegal Eater – food/reality
Images of Canada – documentary
Imprint – news/information
Improv Heaven and Hell – comedy/improvisation
In a Heartbeat – teen drama
In the Kitchen with Stefano Faita – cooking (2011–2014)
In the Making – documentary
In the Mood – music/variety
In Opposition – sitcom
The Indian Detective – comedy-drama
Inquiring Minds – science/children
InSecurity – comedy/sitcom
Inside Entertainment – news/entertainment
Instant Star – drama/teen
Intelligence – drama
Interrupt This Program – documentary
The Irish Rovers – music/variety
It's Happening – music (1960s)
It's a Living – documentary
It's Only Rock & Roll – comedy

J
Jacob Two-Two – children's/animated
Jake and the Kid (1961) - drama
Jake and the Kid (1995) - drama
Jalna – drama/action (1994 France co-production)
Jann – comedy
John Allan Cameron (CTV) – music/variety
The John Allan Cameron Show (CBC) – music/variety
Johnny Test – children's/animated
Jojo's Circus – children's/animated
Jonovision – youth/talk show (1996–2001)
The Journal – news/information
Jozi-H – drama
jPod – drama/comedy
JR Digs – comedy
Junior Chef Showdown – cooking competition
Junior Television Club – children's/news
Junk Brothers – reality
Junk Raiders – reality
Just for Laughs – comedy/stand-up
Just for Laughs Gags – comedy/pranks
Just for Laughs Improv Championships – comedy/improvisation
Just Like Mom – children's game show

K
Katts and Dog – action (police K-9)
Keeping Canada Alive – documentary
Kenny vs. Spenny – comedy
Kevin Spencer – comedy/animated
Kids' CBC – children's
The Kids in the Hall – comedy/sketch (1998–95)
Kids of Degrassi Street – children's/drama (1979–1986)
Kidstreet – game show
Kidstuff – children's
Killjoys – science fiction series (2014–2019)
Kim's Convenience – sitcom
King – police procedural
King of Kensington – comedy/sitcom
Kitchen Equipped – lifestyle
Klahanie – lifestyle/travel
Knock Knock Ghost – paranormal reality/comedy
Kung Fu: The Legend Continues – action/crime/drama/fantasy (1993–1997)

L
Lance et Compte – drama
Land and Sea – documentary
Landscape Artist of the Year Canada – reality competition
The Lang and O'Leary Exchange – business news
The Latest Buzz  – teen sitcom
The Launch – music competition
Learning the Ropes – teen comedy/drama
Leave It to Bryan – reality/home renovation
Less Than Kind – comedy/drama
Let's Go – music (CBC, 1964–1968)
Let's Go – children's (CTV, 1976–1984)
Letterkenny (a/k/a Letterkenny Problems) – comedy
Lexx – science fiction
Liberty Street – drama
Life and Times – documentary
Life with Derek – youth/sitcom
The Life-Sized City – documentary
The Line – police drama
The Listener – supernatural drama
Little Bear – children's/animated
Little Bird – drama
Little Dog – comedy-drama
Little Men – drama
Little Mosque on the Prairie – sitcom
The Little Vampire – children's/adventure (1986–1987)
The Littlest Hobo – drama/action
Live It Up! – information/consumer affairs
Living – lifestyle/variety
Living Clean – interactive talk show
Living in Your Car – comedy/drama
Loft Story – reality
Longhouse Tales – children's
Look Who's Here – talk/informational
Lord Have Mercy! – comedy/sitcom
Lorne Greene's New Wilderness – nature
Lost Girl – supernatural/drama
Love Handles – game show
Love It or List It – lifestyle
Love It or List It Vancouver – lifestyle
Loving Friends and Perfect Couples – soap opera (1983)
Loving Spoonfuls – food/comedy/culture (2000–2004)

M
The Mad Dash – game show
Made in Canada – comedy/sitcom
Madison – youth/drama
The Magic Lie – children's
Magic Shadows – educational
Make the Politician Work – documentary (2009–2011)
Making the Cut: Last Man Standing – sports/reality
Man Alive – religion/spiritual
Maniac Mansion – science fiction/comedy (1990–93)
Mansbridge: One on One – news/information
Mantracker – reality/sport
The Marilyn Denis Show – talk show
Marketplace – informational/consumer affairs
Married Life – comedy-drama
Mary Makes It Easy – cooking
Mary Walsh: Open Book – informational/arts and literature
Mary's Kitchen Crush – cooking
Mason Lee: On the Edge – news/information
Masters of Flip – reality/home renovation
Matchmaker – reality/dating
Material World – comedy/sitcom
Math Patrol – children's/educational
Matt and Jenny – children's/drama
Max, the 2000-Year-Old Mouse – children's/educational
Max Glick – comedy/sitcom
Me & Max – comedy/sitcom
Me Too! – children's
The Medicine Show – documentary
Medicine Woman – documentary
Meeting Place – religious/spirituality
Men with Brooms – sitcom
Mentors – children's
Metropia – soap opera
Michael Coren Live – talk/current events show
Michael, Tuesdays and Thursdays – sitcom
Midday – news/information
The Mike Bullard Show – talk/comedy and variety
Minnow on the Say – children's/drama
Miss Persona – children's (2018–present)
Mr. Chips – lifestyle
Mr. Dressup – children's (1967–1996)
Mr. Hollywood – talk/comedy and variety
Mr. Wizard – children's
Mixed Blessings – comedy/drama
Moccasin Flats – drama/action (2003–2006)
Mona the Vampire – children's/animated (1999–2003)
Moneymakers – informational/business
Monster by Mistake – children's/animated (1996–2003)
Moonshine – drama
Moose TV – sitcom
More Tears – dramatic anthology
Mosquito Lake – comedy/sitcom
Motel Makeover – reality
Motive – police procedural/crime drama (2013-2016)
MovieTelevision – entertainment news
Moving On – documentary
MTV Select – music
MumbleBumble – children's/animated (1998–2000)
Murdoch Mysteries – historical crime drama (2008–present)
Music to See – music (1957)
Music to See – music (1970–1979)
Music Works – music
Mutant X – science fiction/drama (2001–2004)
My Dad the Rock Star – children's/animated (2003–2004)
My Fabulous Gay Wedding – reality (2005)
My Goldfish Is Evil – children's/animated
My Home Town – children's
My Rona Home – reality/competition
My Secret Identity – drama/youth (1988–1991)

N
Naked Josh – comedy (2004–2006)
Nanalan – children's (2000–2006)
The National – news/information
The National Dream – documentary
Naturally, Sadie – youth/sitcom (2005–2007)
The Nature of Things – informational/science
Ned's Newt – children's/animated (1997–1999)
Network – variety (1962–1963)
The New Reality – newsmagazine (2020s–present)
The NewMusic – music (1979–2008)
The Newsroom – comedy/drama (1996–2005)
The Next Step – teen drama (2013–present)
Night Heat – drama/action (1985–1989)
Night Hood – children's/animated (1996–1997)
Night Walk – music/slow television (1986–1993)
Nikita – drama/action (1997–2001)
Nilus the Sandman – children's/animated (1996–1998)
Nirvanna the Band the Show – comedy (2017–present)
North of 60 – drama/action (1992–1997)
North/South – soap opera (2006)
Northwood – drama/action (1991–1994)
Not My Department – sitcom (1987)
Nothing Too Good for a Cowboy – comedy/drama (1998–2000)
Nurses – medical drama (2020-2021)

O
O Canada – comedy/animated/anthology
Odd Job Jack – comedy/animated
Odd Squad – children's/comedy (2014–2022)
The Odyssey – teen drama / fantasy (1992–1994)
Odyssey 5 – science fiction
Off the Record with Michael Landsberg – talk/sports
Ombudsman – news/information
On the Evidence – drama/action
On the Road Again – documentary
Once a Thief – crime
Once Upon a Hamster – children's
One Night Stand with Annie Sibonney – reality
Open Mike with Mike Bullard – talk/comedy and variety
Opening Night – drama/action
Orphan Black – science fiction
Our Hero
The Outer Limits – science fiction
Over the Rainbow – reality/talent competition

P
Pamela Wallin Live – news/talk show
Paradise Falls – soap opera
Parlez-moi – children's
Party Game – game show
The Passionate Eye – news/information
Paw Patrol – children's/animated
Peacemakers – western/crime/drama (2003)
Pecola – children's/animated
The Phoenix Team – drama
Picnicface – sketch comedy
The Pig and Whistle – music/variety
Pillow Talk – comedy
Pilot One – music/variety
Pink Is In - comedy (2021–present)
Pit Pony – drama
Play – music
Played – police procedural (2013)
Political Blind Date – public affairs
Polka Dot Door – children's
Polka Dot Shorts – children's
Popstars – reality
Popular Mechanics For Kids – children's (1997–2001)
The Porter – drama (2021–present)
Porthole TV – travel
POV Sports – sports
Power & Politics – news
Power Play – drama/action (1998–2000)
Power Play – political affairs (2009–present)
Prank Patrol – comedy/reality (2005–2010)
Pretty Hard Cases – police drama (2021–present)
Pride – documentary
Primeval: New World – science fiction
Producing Parker – comedy/animated
Project Runway Canada – reality/competition
Property Virgins – lifestyle
Psi Factor: Chronicles of the Paranormal – science fiction
Puppets Who Kill – comedy/sitcom
Pure – drama (2017-2018)
Pure Pwnage – comedy/mockumentary
Puttnam's Prairie Emporium – children's

Q
QT: QueerTelevision – news/information (1998–2000)
Queer as Folk – drama (2000–2005)
Quentin Durgens, M.P. – drama (1965–1969)
Question Period – news/politics (1967–present)

R
Rabbit Fall – drama
The Raccoons – animated/family/comedy-drama
Race Against the Tide – reality/competition
Radio Active – teen/sitcom
Radio Free Roscoe – children's
Radisson – adventure
Raising Expectations – family comedy
The Rare Breed – news/information
The Ray Bradbury Theater (1985–1992)
Razzle Dazzle – children's
Reach for the Top – game show
Read All About It! – education/fantasy
Ready or Not – youth/drama
Real Fishing Show – outdoors
ReBoot – children's/animated (1994–2001)
Recipe to Riches – reality/competition
Recreating Eden – lifestyle/gardening
The Red Fisher Show – outdoors
The Red Green Show – comedy (1991–2006)
Red Serge – Western comedy-drama
Redwall – children's/animated
ReGenesis – drama
Remedy – medical drama
Rent-a-Goalie – sitcom
Republic of Doyle – comedy/drama
Restaurant Makeover – reality/makeover/home decor
The Rez – Aboriginal drama
Rez Bluez – music
Rick Mercer Report – news/comedy/satire
Rideau Hall – comedy/sitcom
Rise – documentary
Riverdale – soap opera
Road to Avonlea – drama/action (1990–96)
RoboCop: Prime Directives – science fiction/drama
RoboCop: The Series – science fiction/action (1994)
Robson Arms – dramatic anthology
Rock Camp – documentary
Rock Solid Builds – design/renovation (2021–present)
Rock Wars – music competition
Rocket Robin Hood – animated
Rockpoint P.D. – comedy
Rogue – drama (2013–present)
Rolie Polie Olie – children's/animated
Roll Play – children's/exercise (2006–2013)
The Ron James Show – comedy
Rookie Blue – police drama
Rough Cuts – documentary
Royal Canadian Air Farce – comedy/sketch
Rumours – drama/comedy
Rupert – children's/animated
Ruzicka – music/variety

S
The Saddle Club – children's
Sanctuary – science fiction/drama/paranormal
Sarah's House – reality/home renovation
Saturday Night at the Movies – documentary
Sausage Factory – comedy/sitcom
Save Me – medical comedy-drama
The Save-Ums! – children's/animated
Save Us from Our House – reality/home renovation
Saving Hope – supernatural/medical drama
Saying Goodbye – drama anthology
Schitt's Creek – comedy
Science International – informational/science
Science Magazine – informational/science
SCTV – comedy/sketch
Scully: The World Show – talk/informational
Seaway – adventure/drama
Second Jen – sitcom
Seed – comedy
Seeing Things – mystery comedy-drama
The Sentinel – science fiction/drama
Sesame Park – children's
Sex & Violence – drama
Sharon, Lois and Bram's Elephant Show – children's
Shattered – crime drama
The Shields Stories – dramatic anthology
Shoot the Messenger – crime drama
The Shopping Bags – information/reality
Shoresy – comedy
Showdown – game show
Side Effects – Drama
Sidekick – Children's/animated
Sidestreet – drama/action
Silverwing – Children's/animated
SketchCom – comedy/sketch
Skinnamarink TV – children's/comedy
Slim Pig – children's/animated
Slings and Arrows – comedy/drama
SmartAsk – game show
Smith & Smith – comedy/sketch
Snakes and Ladders – comedy/sitcom
Snow Job – comedy/sitcom
So Gay TV – talk/information
So You Think You Can Dance Canada – reality
The Social – talk show
Some Assembly Required – teen comedy
Songs of Freedom – documentary/music
Sophie – comedy/sitcom
Soul – miniseries
South Asian Veggie Table – South Asian and Indian vegetarian cooking show
Space Cases – children's/science fiction/comedy
Speakers' Corner – talk/public access
Spirit Bay – drama/action
Splatalot – reality/comedy
Spliced– children/animated
Sports on Fire – sports documentary
Spun Out – comedy
Spynet – children's
Stargate Atlantis – science fiction
Stargate SG-1 – science fiction
Stargate Universe – science fiction
Starhunter – science fiction
The Starlost – science fiction
The Stationary Ark – documentary
Steven and Chris – talk (2008–2015)
Still Standing – comedy/reality
Stoked – Animated
Strange Days at Blake Holsey High – children
Strange Empire – Western drama
Strange Paradise – suspense
Street Cents – informational/consumer affairs
Street Legal – drama/action
Striking Balance – documentary
Student Bodies – comedy/sitcom
Studio 2 – news/information
Sue Thomas: F.B. Eye – crime drama
Sugar – cooking
Sunday Edition – news/politics
Sunday Report – news/information
Sunnyside – sketch comedy
Sunshine City - comedy/mystery
Sunshine Sketches – comedy/drama
Super Dave Osborne – comedy
Super Why! – children's/animated
Supermodels – reality
Supertown Challenge – game show/comedy/satire
SurrealEstate – science fiction
Survivorman – documentary/adventure
Swiss Family Robinson – family
The Switch – comedy
Switchback – children's

T
Tabloid – public affairs
Take 30 – news show
Take a Chance – quiz show
Tales of the Riverbank – children's
TallBoyz – sketch comedy
Target: The Impossible – documentary
Telepoll – talk
Terminal City – drama
Test Pattern – game show
Testees – comedy/sitcom
That's So Weird! – comedy/variety
Theodore Tugboat – children's
These Arms of Mine – drama
Thicke of the Night – talk show
This Hour Has 22 Minutes – news/comedy/satire (1993–)
This Hour Has Seven Days – news/information
This is Daniel Cook – children's
This is Emily Yeung – children's
This Is the Law – news/information
This Is Pop – music documentary (2021)
This Is Wonderland – drama/action
This Land – news/information
This Sitcom Is...Not to Be Repeated – comedy/improvisation
This Week in Parliament – news/politics
Three Chords from the Truth – comedy
Thrill of a Lifetime – reality
TimeChase – quiz show
Timothy Goes to School – children's/animated
Tiny Plastic Men – comedy
Tiny Talent Time – children's/talent show
Titans – talk/informational
To See Ourselves – drama/action
To Serve and Protect – documentary
To the Wild Country – documentary
Today's Special – children's
Todd and the Book of Pure Evil – Comedy/Action
The Tom Green Show – comedy (later American) (1994–2000)
Tom Stone – crime/drama
The Tommy Banks Show – music/variety
Top Million Dollar Agent – lifestyle (2015–present)
Total Drama – animated
Total Recall 2070 – science fiction (1999)
The Tournament – comedy (2005–2006)
Traders – drama/action
Trailer Park Boys – comedy/sitcom
Train 48 – soap opera
Transplant – medical drama
Travelers – science fiction
Tribal – crime drama (2020–present)
Trickster – drama
Tropical Heat – action/comedy
The Trouble with Tracy – comedy/sitcom
True and the Rainbow Kingdom – children's
Turning Points of History – documentary
Twenty Questions – game show
Twice in a Lifetime – drama
Twitch City – comedy/sitcom
Two – drama

U
U8TV: The Lofters – reality (2001–2002)
Uncle Bobby – children's (1964–1979)
The Undaunted - docudrama (1983)
Under New Management – reality
Under the Umbrella Tree – children's (1986–1993)
Undercover High – prank comedy (2014–2016)
Undercurrents – news/information (1995–2001)
Undergrads – comedy/animated (2001)
Undisrupted – music (2021)
Unsettled – drama
Untamed World – nature
Unusually Thicke – reality/mockumentary
Up at Ours – comedy/sitcom (1979–1982)
Urban Angel – crime/drama (1991–1993)
The Urban Peasant – cooking
Urban Suburban – reality (2011–present)

V
V.I.P. – talk/informational (1973–1983)
Venture – informational/business (1985–2007)
Very Bad Men – documentary
Video Hits – music/variety (1984–1993)
The View from Here – documentary
Vikings – historical drama (2013–present)
Vollies - comedy (2021–present)

W
W5 – news/information (1966–present)
Wall of Chefs – cooking competition (2020–present)
War Story – documentary (2012–present)
Watership Down – children's/animated (1999–2001)
Waterville Gang – children's (1972–1974)
The Watson Report – news/information (1975–1981)
The Way It Is – news/information (1967–1969)
A Way Out – lifestyle/travel (1970–1977)
The Wayne and Shuster Show – comedy/sketch (1954—1990)
The Wedding Planners – drama
The Weekly with Wendy Mesley – news/information
We're All Gonna Die (Even Jay Baruchel) – documentary (2022)
We're Funny That Way! – comedy/documentary (2007)
The West Block – news/information
West Coast – music/variety (1961)
What About Mimi? – children's/animated (2000–2002)
What It's Like Being Alone – animated (2006)
What on Earth – news/information (1971–1975)
What on Earth on CBC – daily weekday interview program (1990–1995)
What Were They Thinking? – comedy/documentary
What Will They Think of Next? – see Science International (1976–1979)
What Would Sal Do? – comedy
What's for Dinner? – lifestyle/cooking
What's New – news/information
What's with Andy? – children's/animated (2001–2007)
Where to I Do? – reality/wedding
The Whiteoaks of Jalna – drama/action (1972)
WGB – music/comedy/sketch (1980–1983)
Wicks – talk/informational (1979–1981)
Wild Canada – science documentary
Wild Kratts – children's/animated (2011–present)
Wild Roses – drama (2009)
Wind at My Back – drama/action (1996–2001)
Wipeout Canada – game show (2011)
Witness – documentary (1992–2004)
Witness to Yesterday – docudrama (1974—1976)
Wojeck – drama (1966–1968)
Wok with Yan – lifestyle/cooking (1980–1982)
Wonder Why? – educational (1990–1994)
Workin' Moms – sitcom (2017)
Working the Engels – sitcom (2014)
World View – news/information
Write On – children's/educational (1976)
Wynonna Earp – supernatural/drama (2016–2021)

X
The X – children's/comedy/talk (2004–2005)
XPM – comedy/sitcom (2004)

Y
Yakkity Yak – children's/animated (2002–2003)
Yam Roll – children's/animated (2006–2007)
Yes You Can – children's (1980–1983)
Yin Yang Yo! – children's/animated (2006–2009)
You Can't Do That on Television – children's/comedy/sketch (1979–1990)
You Gotta Eat Here! – reality/food (2012–2017)
Young Drunk Punk – sitcom (2015–2016)
Yukon Harvest – documentary
Yukon Gold – documentary
Yvon of the Yukon – children's/animated (1999–2005)

Z
ZeD – variety (2002–2006)
Zoe Busiek: Wild Card – drama/mystery (2003–2005)
Zoo Diaries – documentary (2000–2007)
ZOS: Zone of Separation – drama (2009)
Zut! – comedy/sketch (1970–1971)

See also

List of Canadian game shows
List of Quebec television series
List of Australian television series
List of British television programmes
List of Indian television series
List of South African television series

External links
 Canadian Communications Foundation – CBC historical programming list
 Canadian Communications Foundation – CTV historical programming list
 Canadian Communications Foundation – Global historical programming list
 Canadian Communications Foundation – Citytv historical programming list
 Canadian Communications Foundation – CHCH historical programming list
 TVarchive.ca
 CBC Television Series, 1952–1982, Blain Allan

Canada English

Canadian television-related lists
Lists of Canadian television series